Rahim Mehryar was a singer from Afghanistan. He and his wife singer Parasto, were counted as one of the most successful musical duos in the late 1980s that dominated the pop music scene in Afghanistan. Later he moved to Germany, where he and his wife continued their music. Rahim Mehryar died in Germany on June 24, 2010.

References

1956 births
2010 deaths
Afghan musicians
People from Kabul
Afghan Tajik people
Afghan male singers
Persian-language singers
Afghan expatriates in Germany
20th-century Afghan male singers
21st-century Afghan male singers